Greg Lincoln (born 23 March 1980) is an English  former professional footballer who played as a midfielder. He represented England at Under-20 level. He is head coach of England U16s.

Career
Lincoln was born in Cheshunt, Hertfordshire. He began his career as a trainee with Arsenal in 1996, earning a Premier Youth League winners' medal in 1998 and signing a professional contract the same year. While making the bench for League Cup and UEFA Champions League games, by the time he was released by Arsenal, at the end of the 2000–01 season, he had yet to make his first team debut.

On 6 August 2001, he played as a triallist for Rushden & Diamonds in their home friendly against West Ham United, but was released after only playing as a second-half substitute. On 6 September he played as a triallist for Hull City in a reserve game against Mansfield Town, but on 14 September he joined Torquay United on non-contract terms along with his former Arsenal colleague Lee Canoville. He left Plainmoor soon after joining, and on 28 September joined Swedish side Hammarby IF on trial after a recommendation from both Freddie Ljungberg and Liam Brady who knew him from Highbury.

In August 2001, Lincoln joined Torquay United on non-contract terms, along with his former Arsenal teammate Lee Canoville. However, he again failed to make the first team and joined Stevenage Borough later that month, playing in the 0–0 draw away to Southport on 1 September 2001. This was to be his only first team game for Stevenage, Lincoln joining Margate on 20 October 2001. He played just once for Margate. In November 2001 he joined Leyton Orient on trial, but was released without signing for the Brisbane Road side

In June 2002, Lincoln joined Northampton Town, making his league debut on 29 October 2002 as a second-half substitute for Marco Gabbiadini in Northampton's 4–0 defeat away to Oldham Athletic. Lincoln remained with Northampton until May 2004 when he was released. He scored once during his spell at Northampton, his goal coming in a 1–1 draw with Boston United in December 2003.

He had a trial with Barnet, but in August 2004 signed for Redbridge and joined Chelmsford City in June 2005, but in December 2005 moved to Cambridge City.

In May 2007, Lincoln joined Conference South side Thurrock, moving to Aveley in December 2009.

In October 2010, Lincoln was appointed manager of Thurrock. He resigned as manager of Thurrock on 6 January 2011.

On 16 August 2022, Lincoln was appointed as head coach of the England U16s.

Honours
Arsenal
FA Premier Youth League: 1998

References

External links

Living people
1980 births
People from Cheshunt
English footballers
Association football midfielders
Arsenal F.C. players
Torquay United F.C. players
Stevenage F.C. players
Margate F.C. players
Northampton Town F.C. players
Redbridge F.C. players
Chelmsford City F.C. players
Cambridge City F.C. players
Thurrock F.C. players
Aveley F.C. players
English football managers
National League (English football) managers